Brendan James O'Brien (born May 9, 1962) is an American voice and television actor, who is best known for his role as the original voice of Crash Bandicoot and for providing various other character voices for the Crash Bandicoot video games during the Naughty Dog years.

Early life
Brendan O'Brien was born in Hollywood, California on May 9, 1962. He is the son of actor Edmond O'Brien (1915–1985) and actress Olga San Juan (1927–2009). He also has two sisters, television producer Bridget O’Brien Adelman and actress Maria O’Brien.

Career
O'Brien began his acting career in 1973, his first role was in the television film Honor Thy Father. He would later appear in 3 Ninjas: High Noon at Mega Mountain, P.U.N.K.S., Race to Space and Grindhouse.

He got the role of Crash Bandicoot after Joe Pearson suggested that he call Jason Rubin (who was looking for a voice artist). After going to the studio for the call (where his parents used to work), he got the role. The recordings that O'Brien did for Crash Bandicoot were done in an intimate setting at the Alfred Hitchcock Theater.

He also performed additional voices for the animated series adaptation of Spawn and  Ralph Bakshi's Spicy City. He has also acted in several live action television shows such as Candid Camera and The Amazing Live Sea-Monkeys.

O'Brien went on a hiatus from acting in 2004, but would later make his return to acting once again in an episode of Riverdale as a Math Teacher.

Filmography

Film

Television

Video games

Crew work

References

External links
Official site

1962 births
20th-century American male actors
21st-century American male actors
Male actors from Hollywood, Los Angeles
American male film actors
American male television actors
American male voice actors
American male video game actors
Living people
American people of Irish descent
American people of Puerto Rican descent